This page is a complete chronological listing of WAFL Women's premiers. WAFL Women's (WAFLW) is the major state-level women's Australian rules football league in Western Australia.  have won the most premierships with two.

List of premiers
The following is a list of premiers and the grand final results.

Premierships by team
This table summarises all premierships won by each team.

Table correct to the end of the 2022 season.

Premiership frequency

Table correct to the end of the 2022 season.

Premiership droughts
The duration of the drought is given as the number of full seasons contested between premierships; the season in which the drought is broken is considered to be part of the drought, and if the drought began from a club's entry to the league, the club's inaugural season is also considered to be part of the drought.

Table correct to the end of the 2022 season.

See also
 List of West Australian Football League premiers

References

Sources

 

Premiers
Premiers
Women's Australian rules football-related lists